Laurent Lacasa (born 28 September 1964) is a French rower. He competed at the 1988 Summer Olympics and the 1992 Summer Olympics.

References

1964 births
Living people
French male rowers
Olympic rowers of France
Rowers at the 1988 Summer Olympics
Rowers at the 1992 Summer Olympics
Place of birth missing (living people)